Edd Branson is a prominent Zimbabwean charismatic Christian leader, philanthropist and entrepreneur.

Early background
Born Edwin Mutongwizo in 1988 in Harare, Branson grew up in Warren Park suburb where he attended his early education.

Biography
Edd Branson founded Jesus Generation International Ministries in 2017 which has some branches in Zimbabwe, United Kingdom, South Africa, India and Australia, he became popular around the country through his prophesy predictions.

Branson founded The Edd Branson Foundation through which he has received several recognitions and awards. He was appointed by the Global Diplomatic Council as director commissioner of African Culture Diversity and Entrepreneurship. In 2019, he received an honorary doctorate for Philanthropy and Humanitarian Leadership from The Global Academy Of social sciences of India.

Recognition
40 Influential Zimbabweans under 40 of 2017
Top 100 Zimbabwean Leaders under 40 of 2019
Excellence in Leadership and Human Capital Development 2019 - African Achievers Awards, Houses of Parliament London
Global Excellence In Leadership 2019 - Peace Achievers Awards, Nigeria
Peace Ambassador of the year 2019 - Centre for Peace Studies, Sri Lanka
Leadership Award 2019 - Pan African Leadership and Entrepreneurship Development Centre, Abu Dhabi
15th Ambassador, World Habitat Ambassadors Foundation International (WHAF Int’l Hall of fame).
Director, African Cultural Diversity and Entrepreneurship for the Global Diplomatic Council
Commissioner, International Commission for Diplomacy

References

Further read
Most Influential Zimbabweans 2017
NewsDay Zimbabwe live feed
40 Influential Christian leaders in Zimbabwe

Religion in Zimbabwe
Living people
1988 births